Kebira  may refer to:
 Kebira (sponge), a calcareous sponge genus
 Kebira Crater, the name that has recently been proposed for a circular topographic feature in the Sahara desert